Katariina Souri (born Minna Katariina "Kata" Kärkkäinen; 27 October 1968) is a Finnish author, artist, columnist and Playboy's Playmate of the Month for December, 1988. She has been a writer after her brief Playboy career. On January 25, 2010, Kata Kärkkäinen announced that she changed her name to Katariina Souri.

Katariina Souri married Finnish rock musician Anzi Destruction in 2010. The couple divorced in 2012 but continued living together.

Novels
Minä ja Morrison, 1999. Also a feature film (2001).
Vangitse minut vapaaksi, 2001.
Tulikärpäsiä, 2004. (autobiographical)
Jumalasta seuraava, 2006.
Kahdeksas huone, 2008.

Discography
I Need Love / Lonely Eyes, single by Kata, Bang Trax  Finland	1989

See also
 List of people in Playboy 1980–1989

References

External links

 
 
 

1968 births
Living people
Finnish women novelists
Writers from Helsinki
Finnish LGBT novelists
1980s Playboy Playmates
Mensans